Emden is a lunar impact crater that is located in the northern hemisphere on the far side of the Moon.  It is named after Jacob Robert Emden (1862-1940).

The crater lies to the northwest of the larger crater Rowland, and to the east-northeast of Tikhov.  It has been heavily damaged by subsequent impacts, leaving the rim worn and irregular and the interior partly covered by craters. The western half of the rim in particular is heavily damaged, with almost the entire edge and inner wall covered by overlapping craters. The most prominent of these is a crater along the southern wall. There is a merged crater pair on the western part of the interior floor and a joined crater pair on the northeast floor. The most intact area of floor is in the southeast, although even here the surface is pitted by multiple tiny craterlets.

Satellite craters
By convention these features are identified on lunar maps by placing the letter on the side of the crater midpoint that is closest to Emden.

References

 
 
 
 
 
 
 
 
 
 
 
 

Impact craters on the Moon